The 1990 Heinz Southern 500, the 41st running of the event, was a NASCAR Winston Cup Series race held on September 2, 1990 at Darlington Raceway in Darlington, South Carolina. Contested over 367 laps on the 1.366 mile (2.198 km) speedway, it was the 21st race of the 1990 NASCAR Winston Cup Series season. Dale Earnhardt of Richard Childress Racing won the race.

Summary
The traditional Labor Day event saw Dale Earnhardt capture the Richard Childress Racing's fourth pole of the season before winning the race. Even with an ill-handling racecar, Earnhardt recovered, made up a lost lap and then having to battle a vibrating tire to outrun Ernie Irvan to the checkered flag. With the $200,000 payday, Dale became the first race car driver in history to pass the $11,000,000 mark in career winnings. During the race, Morgan Shepherd and Ken Schrader made contact, sending Schrader into the wall. An angry Schrader returned to the race, and rammed Shepherd into the wall, knocking both drivers out of the race.

Earnhardt, Bill Elliott, and Geoff Bodine timed together in the top three and combined to lead 286 laps between them; Bodine faded to eighth while Elliott finished fourth and Ernie Irvan led 70 laps and grabbed second, but no one could catch Earnhardt en route to his third Southern 500 in his previous four starts.

Phillip Duffie made his only NASCAR appearance at this race.

Top 10 results

Race statistics
 Time of race: 4:04:16
 Average Speed: 
 Pole Speed: 
 Cautions: 10 for 51 laps
 Margin of Victory: 4.19 sec
 Lead changes: 20
 Percent of race run under caution: 13.9%         
 Average green flag run: 28.7 laps

References

Heinz Southern 500
Heinz Southern 500
Heinz Southern 500
NASCAR races at Darlington Raceway